Pacharo Mzembe is an Australian actor. He has performed on stage, in several television series and in feature films.

Early life 
Mzembe's parents originate from Malawi, but he was born in Zimbabwe. He migrated to Australia at the age of six to the state of Queensland.

Acting career 
Mzembe is an alumnus of the National Institute of Dramatic Art (NIDA), after being accepted when he was 17 years old. In the summer of 2012, he undertook a run across Australia, which he founded and named the Run of Awareness, with the aim of highlighting the inequality of educational opportunities for disadvantaged youth in Australia and around the world.

Mzembe started his career in theatre, but has since appeared in numerous television and movie roles, including Monster Problems, Channel Nine’s Here Come the Habibs, Harrow on the ABC, and SBS's Safe Harbour. On the stage, he played Martin Luther King Jr. in The Mountaintop, as well as appearing in Prize Fighter, for which he won a Green Room Award and was nominated for the Sydney Theatre and Helpmann Awards for his portrayal of an ex-child soldier turned boxing contender.

Mzembe is also passionate about youth empowerment and filmmaking.

Works

Film
 The Greatest Battle Lies Within 
Kind Of Man
 Love and Monsters
Space/Time
Sinbad and The Minotaur
Summer Coda
Vinyl

Television
 Texas Rising
 Safe Harbour
Danger 5 Season 2
Underbelly: Razor
Spirited
Terra Nova
False Witness
Wakefield
La Brea

Theatre
The Tragedy of King Richard The Third
Prize Fighter
A Midsummer Night's Dream
The Mountaintop
Solomon & Marion
Gwen in Purgatory
Rockabye
An Oak Tree
Antigone
Can't Pay? Won't Pay!
Romeo & Juliet

Awards
Green Room Award winner, Theatre Companies Performer, 2019
Helpmann Awards, Best Actor in a leading role, Nominee for Prize Fighter, 2016
South Australian Screen Awards (SASA) - Best Performance nominee for Kind of Man, 2009
St Kilda Film Festival - Best Actor nominee for Kind of Man, 2009

References

External links

Malawian male film actors
Australian male actors
Living people
Year of birth missing (living people)
Zimbabwean emigrants to Australia
Malawian male television actors
Australian actors of African descent